Dicrochile is a genus of beetles in the family Carabidae, containing the following species:

 Dicrochile artensis Perroud, 1864 
 Dicrochile brevicollis (Chaudoir, 1852) 
 Dicrochile caledonica, Perroud 1864 
 Dicrochile gigas Castelnau, 1867
 Dicrochile goryi (Boisduval, 1835) 
 Dicrochile idae Moore, 1985
 Dicrochile minuta Castelnau, 1867
 Dicrochile punctatostriata Castelnau, 1867
 Dicrochile punctipennis Castelnau, 1867
 Dicrochile punctulata Sloane, 1923
 Dicrochile quadricollis Castelnau, 1867
 Dicrochile ventralis Blackburn, 1891

References

Licininae